Roberto Tejerizo (born 15 April 1988) is an Argentine international rugby union player who plays as a prop.   He currently plays for the Viadana in Italian Top10.

Club career

Tejerizo has played for the Tucumán Lawn Tennis Club in his native state in Argentina and also turned out for the Pampas XV when they appeared in South Africa's Vodacom Cup tournament in 2011 and 2012.

Super Rugby

Tejerizo was a member of the Jaguares squad which competed in Super Rugby for the first time during the 2016 Super Rugby season.   He made 4 appearances for them in their debut campaign in the competition, one of which was from the start.

International career

Tejerizo represented Argentina at Under-19 level in 2007 and has also played for Argentina A under its guises of the Jaguares or Argentina XV.

Super Rugby Statistics

References

External links
 
 
 

1988 births
Living people
Argentine rugby union players
Argentina international rugby union players
Rugby union props
Jaguares (Super Rugby) players
Sportspeople from San Miguel de Tucumán
Pampas XV players